Mariia Serhiivna Berlinska, or Mariya Berlinsʼka (born 1988) is a Ukrainian military volunteer and women's rights advocate. She was a participant in the Revolution of Dignity in February 2014 and subsequently volunteered for the War in Donbas as an aerial reconnaissance drone operator. Returning from the front, Berlinska founded a free school to train other Ukrainian military volunteers in aerial reconnaissance.

Beginning in 2015, Berlinska partnered with other female volunteer soldiers to champion women's rights and integration into the Ukrainian Armed Forces. She coordinated Invisible Battalion, a series of three reports on Ukrainian military women's recognition, reintegration, and harassment, and produced two films on women veterans in collaboration with women filmmakers, that received international attention. This work is credited for a series of laws gradually granting women equality in the Ukrainian armed forces. She is a co-founder of the Women's Veteran Movement non-governmental organization, a senior advisor for a program to reintegrate veterans into society, and recipient of multiple awards.

Early life 
Her parents were teachers; her father, Sergiy, taught history and literature, and her mother taught French.

Berlinska graduated from Kamyanets-Podilsky Ivan Ohienko National University, and went for a master's degree in history at the National University of Kyiv-Mohyla Academy, specializing in Jewish history.

In her spare time, Berlinska played guitar, and co-organized the annual  music festivals with bands such as Lyapis Trubetskoy and Skryabin, using part of the profits to pay artists to decorate houses in Kamianets-Podilskyi. Berlinska completed her master's in 2015 after a break for the war.

Activism and military service

Berlinska joined the Euromaidan protests on 22 November 2013 and stayed through the Ukrainian Revolution of 2014. She compiled a database of the injured in hospitals, built barricades, delivered water and self-defence leaflets. When she met with gender discrimination from male protesters, she gave speeches on women's rights. Her leg was injured during the protests, and years later she used a walking stick. She was also wounded with rubber bullets and hospitalized for bilateral otitis, sinusitis, and bronchitis due to the cold weather.

Military volunteer 

In mid-2014, Berlinska sought to become involved in the War in Donbas. She joined the Ukrainian Army's volunteer Aidar Battalion after being turned away by other volunteer units on the basis of gender. With the aid of material on the internet, she trained in Kyiv as a pilot of aerial reconnaissance drones. On 1 September, Berlinska left the academy and arrived in Shchastia, at the front, the next day. Her military call sign was "Marie Curie". Berlinska's father also volunteered for the War in Donbas in 2016, but was initially turned down due to his age, 58, until Berlinska intervened on his behalf. He served as a Captain in the 24th Mechanized Brigade, and deputy brigade commander for psychological support.

In January 2015, Berlinska founded the Ukrainian Centre for Aerial Reconnaissance.
 
This is a free training centre for Ukrainian volunteers, based at Kyiv-Mohyla Academy, and run by volunteer civilian instructors, teaching soldiers how to operate drones, topography, and meteorology in a three to four-week course with donated drones. One of the volunteer teachers, an art director for a television channel, had originally taught Berlinska. By November 2016, the school had trained about 150 soldiers. One of the trainees was Yulia Tolopa, a female Russian volunteer, who assisted Berlinska with drone reconnaissance at the front in mid-2016.

Berlinska unsuccessfully went to court in November 2017 to prove her participation in hostilities as a volunteer to obtain moral satisfaction and to serve as an example. The court ruled that she had proven her case, but then the Ministry of Defense appealed and won, since, despite witnesses and photo and video evidence, there were no written orders. However, after this loss, Berlinska was contacted by Ukrainian Defense Minister Stepan Poltorak, who asked for a meeting. After this meeting the Ministry announced plans to increase its own funding for drones and to found its own aerial reconnaissance school in 2018.

Invisible Battalion series

In 2015, Berlinska became the project coordinator for Invisible Battalion, a report examining the participation of women in the Ukrainian armed forces. The title referred to the unknown role of women fighting for Ukraine in the War in Donbas. The report, by Tamara Martsenyuk, Anna Hrytsenko, and Anna Kvit, was presented in Kyiv in December 2015, and was published in English and Ukrainian by UN Women and the Kyiv-Mohyla Law and Politics Journal in 2016.

The report found that female soldiers were forbidden by law from holding military commands, did not have basic needs met, and, despite some women being in combat roles, were all categorized as support personnel. As a result, female soldiers did not receive the same salaries, legal protections, compensation for injuries, post-combat trauma care, and opportunities for career advancement in the military as male personnel. Largely because of the report, the Ministry of Defence issued Decree 337, allowing women to officially serve as snipers, intelligence officers, and commanders of military hardware, and in 2017 opened up 62 combat positions to women.

In 2017, Berlinska organized and produced a documentary film also titled Invisible Battalion, profiling six female soldiers who served in the War in Donbas without being recognized for it: Yuliia Paievska, a paramedic; Yulia Matvienko, called "Belka", a sniper, officially listed as a medical assistant; Olena Bilozerska, another sniper, never officially enlisted; Oksana Yakubova, suffering from post-traumatic stress disorder (PTSD); Andriana Susak, who fought to retake Schastia while wearing a balaclava to hide her gender, and was officially listed as a seamstress; and Daria Zubenko, paramedic. It was 89 minutes long, in Ukrainian and Russian with English subtitles. Berlinska did not have any film production training, so again she learned from the Internet. The executive producer was Oksana Ivantsiv, and it was directed by Iryna Tsilyk, Svitlana Lischynska and Alina Gorlova. Each of the directors directed two of the soldiers' stories. The directors worked unpaid. Lischynska directed the two stories about the snipers, which were filmed at the front.

In 2018, Berlinska produced the sequel documentary No Obvious Signs (referring to the fact that psychological trauma is not as visible as physical wounds), directed by Gorlova, about Yakubova's struggles with PTSD. This film won the MDR Film Prize for Outstanding Eastern European Documentary at the 2018 Dok Leipzig film festival.

In 2018 and again in 2019, Berlinska toured the United States, Canada, and the United Kingdom with several of the women from the Invisible Battalion film to screen the film and promote the Invisible Battalion 2.0 study. This led to a May 2018 confrontation between Berlinska and Susak with Russian diplomat Maxim Buyakevich at the Headquarters of the United Nations in New York City in which Berlinska asked Buyakevich, "Why are you killing our people?". The Russian Foreign Ministry characterized this interaction as the Ukrainians threatening the diplomat with death.

In November 2019, Berlinska and two of the authors of the first Invisible Battalion study published Invisible Battalion 2.0: Women Veterans Returning to Peaceful Life, a follow-up study on how female veterans used Ukraine Government services to reintegrate to civilian status.

In August 2020, Berlinska's Institute of Gender Programs, the NGO founded to continue the "Invisible Battalion" project, began the advocacy campaign "Invisible Battalion 3.0: Sexual Harassment In The Military Sphere In Ukraine". It was a multifaceted campaign, beginning with an anonymous survey of male and female veterans, which showed that 70% had witnessed or been the victims of sexual harassment in the military. 
There was an online course on the Prometheus educational platform titled "Gender equality and combating sexual harassment in the military sphere".
A chatbot running on the Invisible Battalion web site enabled military personnel to receive information and psychological and legal assistance about sexual harassment completely anonymously.
In June 2021 the campaign authors and a representative of the Armed Forces of Ukraine delivered a final report with an analysis of current legislation on sexual harassment, with recommendations for legislative changes, and a signed memorandum of cooperation from the General Staff of the Armed Forces.

Women's Veteran Movement 

At first, these were informal meetings of women veterans in different cities, supported by UN Women and the European Endowment for Democracy. They were inspired by Berlinska's Invisible Battalion project and film. It was officially registered as an NGO in October 2019, with the three founders Berlinska, Andriana Susak-Arekhta and Kateryna Pryimak. In addition to mutual support meetings, the NGO provides psychological rehabilitation for women veterans suffering from PTSD and substance addiction, conducts online training in business, management, and IT courses, helps with gynecological services, and has planted five "Alleys of Memory" in honor of dead women veterans in Kramatorsk, Kyiv, Lviv, Cherkasy and Zhytomyr.

In September 2018, the Ukrainian parliament passed law 2523-VIII equalizing the capabilities of men and women in the military; Berlinska was a co-author.

In 2021, Berlinska served as a senior technical advisor and program director for the IREX program to reintegrate Ukrainian veterans into civilian society.

By 2021, over 15% of the Ukrainian armed forces were female, over twice the proportion in 2014. However, when in July 2021 the Ministry of Defense released images of women Ukrainian cadets marching in high heels, it met with widespread international criticism, and citing Berlinska; the subsequent photos had the women in combat boots.

Honors 
In November 2015, Berlinska was awarded the Euromaidan SOS volunteer award. In December 2017, the Kyiv Post gave her its "Top 30 Under 30" award. In July 2019, the Embassy of the United States, Kyiv included her in an exhibit paying tribute to 19 Ukrainian and 29 American outstanding women. In 2020, she was listed among the 100 most influential women of Ukraine according to Focus magazine and the readers of its website.

References

External links 
  official website
  official website

1988 births
Kamyanets-Podilsky Ivan Ohienko National University alumni
Living people
National University of Kyiv-Mohyla Academy alumni
People from Kamianets-Podilskyi
Ukrainian female military personnel
Ukrainian military personnel of the war in Donbas
Ukrainian women's rights activists
Veterans' rights activists